Droom were a Canadian electronic music duo formed in 2002 in Vancouver that combined elements of futurepop, synthpop, post punk and gothic rock.  The band had two club hit singles and enjoyed success on college radio charts. The musical style has been likened to that of Images in Vogue Depeche mode, New Order and the cure, and The Province referred to the duo's style on 128 ½ Days as "the darker side of Depeche Mode."

Biography
Droom was formed in the summer of 2002 by Graham Jackson and William Winslow-Hansen from the many discussions during Jacksons and Winslow-Hansens tenure in aLUnARED. They immediately began working on tracks for their debut album, "128 ½ days". They enjoyed the success of two club hit singles, "While We Can" and "Stay!", and they quickly gained a growing fanbase in the underground music scene.

The band played a show in San Antonio, Texas as part of a synthpop  festival in 2003. The band members continued to spend the majority of their time on writing and recording new material. When "128 ½ days" was released it charted on many online and college radio charts in North America and around the globe. Droom decided to pave its own way in order to bring their music to their fans. When they felt that they had recorded enough material to comprise a 2nd full-length album, Droom formed their own record label to release their subsequent 10 songs and voice of ghosts albums

Discography
 While We Can EP (2003)
 Stay! EP (2003)
 128 ½ Days (2004)
 Blood Culture EP (2004)
 Ten Songs (2005)
 The Voice of Ghosts (2006)

References

External links
Droom at CBC Radio 3
Exclaim.ca review of "Blood Culture"
Exclaim.ca review of The Voice of Ghosts

Musical groups established in 2002
Musical groups disestablished in 2007
Musical groups from Vancouver
Canadian electronic music groups
2002 establishments in British Columbia
2007 disestablishments in British Columbia